Reginald Stewart may refer to:
Reg Stewart (Australian footballer) (1878–1952), Australian rules footballer
Reginald Stewart (conductor), American conductor of Baltimore Symphony Orchestra in 1950s
Reg Stewart (footballer, born 1925) (1925–2011), English footballer
Reginald Harcourt Stewart, commissioner of police in Aden, got Queen's Police Medal as part of 1957 Birthday Honours
Reginald W. Stewart, pilot of Air Canada Flight 189 which crashed in 1978